Temple Independent School District is a public school district based in Temple, Texas, United States. Temple schools began instruction June 12, 1883. It is the largest employer in Temple, with 1300 employees.

District Leadership
Superintendent of Schools: Dr. Bobby Ott, Ed.D.
Assistant Superintendent of Student Services: Eric Haugeberg, M.Ed.
Assistant Superintendent of Curriculum and Instruction: Lisa Adams, Ed.D.
Assistant Superintendent of Finance & Operations: Kent Boyd, M.Ed.
Assistant Superintendent of Human Resources: Donna Ward, Ed.D.
Chief of Communications and Community Relations: Christine Parks, M.Ed.

Board of Trustees
In 2011, TISD Board of Trustees was named "Board of the Year" by the ESC XII Service Center. 
District 1 - Virginia Suarez, Secretary (term May 2016-May 2019) 
District 2 - Linell Davis (term May 2017-May 2020)  
District 3 - Dan Posey, President (term May 2018-May 2021)
District 4 - Ronnie Gaines, Vice President (term August 2018-May 2021)
District 5 - Sandhya Sanghi (term May 2018-May 2021) 
District 6 - Shannon Gowan (term May 2016-May 2019) 
District 7 - Shannon Myers (term May 2018-May 2021)

Quick Facts
Through the years, Temple ISD has produced over 200 National Merit Scholar Award winners, including Black Achievement and Hispanic Recognition Scholars. 
Temple ISD was the first District in Central Texas to offer the International Baccalaureate (IB) diploma and has, to date, awarded over 100 IB diplomas. 
Temple ISD is expanding the International Baccalaureate program to include a Middle Years Programme at Travis Middle School Science Academy in 2012 and a Primary Years Programme in 2013 at an undetermined elementary school.
The District has exceeded state and national averages in SAT scores for 13 consecutive years and has received numerous other state and national recognition. 
Temple High School has been recognized as one of "America's Top Public High Schools" by Newsweek. 
Temple High School has been recognized by Achieve Texas as a Best Practices high school for the Institutes of Study and Career & Technology Programs.
Bonham Middle School and Western Hills Elementary School have been recognized as a "Best Public School" by Texas Monthly.

Schools

High School (Grades 9-12)
Temple High School
Edwards Academy

Middle Schools (Grades 6-8)
Bonham Middle School
Lamar Middle School
Travis Middle School Science Academy

Elementary Schools (Grades K-4)
Meridith-Dunbar Elementary
1987-88 National Blue Ribbon School

Elementary Schools (Grades K-5)
Cater Elementary
Hector P. Garcia Elementary - It opened in 1998 and has an English-Spanish bilingual program for all students.  it had about 500 students.
Jefferson Elementary
Kennedy-Powell Elementary
Raye-Allen Elementary
Scott Elementary
Thornton Elementary
Western Hills Elementary

Early Childhood Center (Pre-Kindergarten)
Bethune Early Childhood Center
Dickson Early Childhood Center

References

External References
Temple ISD
Temple ISD Twitter
Temple ISD YouTube

School districts in Bell County, Texas
1883 establishments in Texas